USS Neptune has been the name of more than one United States Navy ship, and may refer to:

 , a 294-ton side-wheel steam gunboat, was briefly named Neptune when first commissioned
 , a 1,244-ton screw steamship, served during the American Civil War
 , a monitor in commission from 1864 to 1877, briefly named USS Neptune during 1869
 , was a collier that carried the first United States troops to Europe in World War I
 , was a Neptune-class cable repair ship, acquired by the US Navy in 1953 as USS Neptune (ARC-2) and scrapped in 2005

In fiction
 A fictitious U.S. Navy nuclear submarine named USS Neptune was the setting of the 1978 movie Gray Lady Down

United States Navy ship names